Henrietta Marrie  (née Fourmile) (born 1954) is an Australian indigenous rights activist.
She is an Aboriginal Australian from the Yidinji tribe, directly descended from Ye-i-nie, an Aboriginal leader in the Cairns region. In 1905, the Queensland Government awarded Ye-i-nie with a king plate in recognition of her local status as a significant Walubara Yidinji leader.
 
She is an advocate for the rights of her own Gimuy Walubarra Yidinji families, as well as for the cultural rights of indigenous peoples nationally and internationally.

The Encyclopaedia of Aboriginal Australia identifies Marrie as a notable Aboriginal Australian in an entry that includes:

Fourmile has been involved in extensive research in the areas of Aboriginal cultural heritage and museums, the politics of Aboriginal heritage and the arts and recently the area of Aborigines and cultural tourism.

She has been a senior fellow at the United Nations University and an Adjunct Associate Professor with the Centre for Social Responsibility in Mining at the University of Queensland. She is currently Associate Professor, Office of Indigenous Engagement at the Cairns campus of the Central Queensland University.

In 2018, she was named as one of the Queensland Greats by Queensland Premier Annastacia Palaszczuk in a ceremony at the Queensland Art Gallery on 8 June 2018.

Country 
Marrie's country within local Aboriginal tradition, to which she holds some property rights under Native Title law, is that country that was once wholly possessed, occupied, used and enjoyed by "King" Ye-i-nie and the Walubarra Yidinji families generally:

The area of the foreshore of the City of Cairns was traditionally known as Gimuy – after the Slippery Blue Fig Tree. The traditional lands of the Gimuy Walubara Yidinji People extend south of the Barron River to Wrights Creek (south of Edmonton), west into the ranges behind Cairns, and east into Trinity Inlet, including Admiralty Island, to the adjacent waters of the outer Great Barrier Reef. The lands in the Cairns suburb of Woree, close to Admiralty Island and Trinity Inlet, were the principal traditional camping grounds of the Gimuy Walubara Yidinji people.

Biographical details

Marrie was born and raised in Yarrabah, Queensland (an Aboriginal community approx 7 km south-east of Cairns), the eldest daughter of Henry Fourmile (aka Queballum – cyclone), grandson to the Yidinji warrior Ye-i-nie (Aboriginal Peace Maker and "King" of Cairns).

She went to school in Yarrabah, and later studied teaching at the South Australian College of Advanced Education, where she first obtained a Diploma in Teaching. Later, after the College had been transformed into the University of South Australia, she obtained a Graduate Diploma of Arts (Indigenous Studies).

By 1988 Marrie was lecturing at Griffith University, Brisbane, and in 1991 had managed to return to Cairns (Gimuy) region, where she first assisted co-ordinate the Cairns College of Technical and Further Education's Aboriginal ranger training program, then by 1994, had become the Cairns Coordinator of a new Aboriginal and Torres Strait Islander Participation, Research and Development Centre in James Cook University.

From Cairns, Marrie undertook a Masters in Environmental and Local Government Law (through Macquarie University). Her interests and concerns moved to biocultural diversity, indigenous intellectual property, and traditional ecological knowledge, and as such, by 1997, she had moved on and taken up a position with the United Nations Secretariat for the Convention on Biological Diversity, where she was the first Aboriginal Australian to be appointed to a full-time professional position in a United Nations agency.

Since 2003, Marrie moved her focus back towards Cairns, first working as the Christensenfund's North Australian Program Officer assisting that philanthropic organisation distribute grants and funds to help promote, sustain, and encourage indigenous biocultural diversity across Australia's north (including the Cairns region), and now working as an associate professor at the Central Queensland University's Cairns campus.

Awards and honours 
 Member of the Order of Australia (General Division):  named a member of the Order of Australia on Australia Day, 26 January 2018, for her significant service to the community as an advocate for indigenous cultural heritage and intellectual property rights, and to education, with the Queensland Governor Paul de Jersey officially presenting the honor to her at a ceremony held on 30 April 2018

Publications
 

 

 

 

 

 

 

 

   (1992) 1(56) Aboriginal Law Bulletin 3.

 

 

 

 

 
  Fourmile, Henrietta (1996) "Making Things Work: Aboriginal and Torres Strait Islander Involvement in BioRegional Planning" Biodiversity Series Paper No. 10. Department of Environment, Sport & Territories  Accessed 18 August 2017

References

External links
Henrietta Marrie's 'Deadly Story', Queensland Department of Aboriginal and Torres Strait Islander Partnerships Accessed 12 June 2018
Aboriginal Intellectual Property Rights on Medicinal Plants with Henrietta Marrie - 3CR Earth Matters January 2017 Accessed 16 December 2018
Henrietta Marrie digital story and oral history as part of the First Nation Elders oral histories and digital stories (North Queensland) Collection, State Library of Queensland

Indigenous Australian writers
Australian indigenous rights activists
Women human rights activists
Living people
1954 births
Queensland Greats
Academic staff of Central Queensland University